The SVI-838, also known as X'press 16, is the last microcomputer produced by Spectravideo (at Hong Kong). Although it was a PC clone, it had the standard sound and video coprocessors of the MSX2, making it a hybrid system. The sales were unimpressive and it is now considered a collectible.

With a SVI-811 adapter, the machine could run MSX1 programs in cartridge.

Technical specifications

Peripherals 
Main itens:
 SVI-109P: Quickshot IX, joyball (IBM compatible)
 SVI-811: MSX1 Game Adapter (an adapter with a Zilog Z80A UCP and MSX standard joystick ports)
 SVI-812: Multifunction card (384 KiB RAM, RS-232C, RTC)
 SVI-813: cooler
 SVI-814P: PAL RF Adapter (to colour TVs or RGB monitor)
 SVI-815: Monitor Cable (D15 to 21 pins adapter, to RGB monitor)
 SVI-816: Monitor Cable (D15 to 8 pins adapter, to digital/analog RGB monitor).

References

External links 
-SVI-838 X'Press at Museo de los 16 Bits
 

IBM PC compatibles
MSX